"C Is For Cookie", by Joe Raposo, is a song performed by Cookie Monster (Frank Oz), a Muppet character from the preschool television series Sesame Street. It was first performed in Season 3, although it had been released on The Muppet Alphabet Album. Along with Kermit's "Bein' Green" and Ernie's "Rubber Duckie", it is one of the show's most recognizable songs. The original version was made in 1971 and was one of the few Sesame Street sketches directed by Jim Henson.

History
According to the Muppet Central articles on the "Songs from the Street Boxed Set, people really liked cookies. In 1971, Jim Henson and his performers teamed with Jerry Juhl, Joe Raposo and Jeff Moss to write a sketch on each letter of the alphabet". C Is For Cookie derives from this project.
Actress Candice Bergen lip-syncs the song when she visited Sesame Street.

A version was included on Sesame Street Fever. A 12" promo single included disco remixes by Larry Levan and Roy Thode.

In 1993, a new operatic version was taped, featuring opera singer Marilyn Horne as Cleopatra in an Egyptian setting, with a pyramid made entirely out of cookies in the background. At the end of the song once "Cleopatra" is carried away out of sight, Cookie Monster appears in Egyptian attire and pulls a cookie off the pyramid, causing it to collapse with a huge crash while he eats it.

Since then, several authorized and unauthorized versions of the song have been produced, including "funky" and "sweet" versions released on the 2003 record Cookie Monster & the Girls. Laura Pace's review of the home video Elmo's World: The Street We Live On noted 'the bizarreness of "C is for Cookie" done in Aida-style opera'. A short reprise of the song is also performed by Cookie Monster and the cast of Sesame Street on the 1975 album Bert & Ernie Sing-Along. In addition, since the advent of YouTube, there have also been recordings of the song, regular and operatic, in reverse, under such titles as "C Is For Cookie Reversed" or "Cheese Good For Fleas" (which is what the phrase "C is for Cookie" sounds like dubbed backwards).

Sheet music of the song has been published by the Hal Leonard Corporation, Sheet Music Plus, and others. The toy "Letter of the Day Cookie Jar" features Cookie Monster saying a short phrase about each letter. For "C", he says "C is for Cookie". He also adds that a donut is a 'C' if you eat part of it.

References

External links
 
 Raposo, Joe: C Is For Cookie – lyrics

Sesame Street songs
Songs written by Joe Raposo
1971 songs
Songs about language
Cookies in popular culture